Samuel Birmann (11 August 1793 - 27 September 1847) was a Swiss painter.

His father was the painter Peter Birmann (1758-1844).

He was married with Juliana Birmann-Vischer (1785-1859). After his death, she adopted Martin Grieder (1853).

References
This article was initially translated from the German Wikipedia.

External links

 
 Pictures and texts of Souvenirs de la vallée de Chamonix by Samuel Birmann can be found in the database VIATIMAGES.

19th-century Swiss painters
Swiss male painters
1793 births
1847 deaths
19th-century Swiss male artists